Rocky Run-Wilcox Township is one of the twenty-four townships in Hancock County, Illinois, United States. It was created after a referendum merged Wilcox Township and Rock Run Township.

History
Rocky Run Township was established November 6, 1849. Wilcox Township was established November 15, 1855 after neighboring Warsaw Tonwship became coterminous with Warsaw, Illinois.

After population decline left both townships with too few individuals interested in serving as elected officials in the township, a referendum to merge was passed by voters in both townships. That same election, a similar consolidation referendum was passed in Montgomery County, but failed in Ogle County. The Hancock County Board voted to name the new township Rocky Run-Wilcox Township over then-Wilcox Supervisor Duane Taylor's proposed Green Plains Township.

Government
On April 4, 2017, the Republican slate ran nearly unopposed and won each office in the township. Former Wilcox Supervisor Duane Taylor finished fifth for four trustee positions in the only contested township election.

References

Townships in Hancock County, Illinois
Townships in Illinois